Pieter Claesz (c. 1597 – 1 January 1660) was a Dutch Golden Age painter of still lifes.

Biography

He was born in Berchem, Belgium, near Antwerp, where he became a member of the Guild of St. Luke in 1620. He moved to Haarlem in 1620, where his son, the landscape painter Nicolaes Pieterszoon Berchem was born (October 1). He and Willem Claeszoon Heda, who also worked in Haarlem, were the most important exponents of the "ontbijt" or dinner piece. They painted with subdued, virtually monochromatic palettes, the subtle handling of light and texture being the prime means of expression. Claesz generally chose objects of a more hospitable kind than Heda, although his later work became more colourful and decorative. Claesz's still lifes often suggest allegorical purpose, with skulls serving as reminders of human mortality. The two men founded a distinguished tradition of still life painting in Haarlem. Pieter Claesz was influenced by the artist movement 'Vanitas'.

Legacy
Claesz is registered in the Haarlem Guild of St. Luke as the teacher of his son, Nicolaes Berchem, in 1634, but Nicolaes preferred landscapes to still life painting and later after a trip his talent in music. Claesz had, in addition to his son, the pupils Evert van Aelst, Floris van Dyck, Christian Berentz, Floris van Schooten, and Jan Jansz Treck.

References

National Gallery of Art.

External links
 Pieter Claesz at PubHist

1590s births
1660 deaths
Flemish still life painters
17th-century Flemish painters
Dutch Golden Age painters
Dutch male painters
People from Berchem
Artists from Haarlem
Dutch still life painters
Painters from Antwerp
Painters from Haarlem